Mohammed Afzal Zullah was born on April 19, 1928, in Bijnial, Mandrah, Gujar Khan, District Rawalpindi. He graduated in 1948 from the University of Punjab with a degree in Arts. In 1950, he received the degree in Law from Punjab University Lahore. He enrolled as a Pleader in 1950 and started practicing law in Sahiwal. Later on he shifted to Rawalpindi in 1951 and to Lahore in 1961.

He was appointed as Additional Judge of the West Pakistan High Court in May 1968, he became permanent Judge of the High Court in March 1970. He was elevated to the Supreme Court in 1979. In the same year he became member of Shariat Appellate Bench, Supreme Court of Pakistan. He became the Chairman of the Bench in 1982. He acted as the Chief Justice from March 4 to 7, 1984. Justice Zullah became the Chief Justice of Pakistan from January 1, 1990, to March 19, 1993.

He also remained a Member Syndicate, at the University of Engineering and Technology Lahore, Member Board of Studies in Law University of Multan, Member Board of Trustees Islamic University Islamabad and Member Selection Board Quaid-i-Azam University Islamabad.

See also
Chief Justices of Pakistan
Supreme Court of Pakistan
List of Pakistanis

References

1928 births
Chief justices of Pakistan
2011 deaths
Pakistani judges